Silvia Giner Vergara (born in Seville, Andalusia, Spain, 31 December 1980) is a Spanish actress.

Background 
Vergara's education include drama studies with Ramon Guzman Resino, and Management Information Systems at university.

In 2005, she made her first foray into Latin American cinema in Buenos Aires, Argentina, in Space of appearances (El espacio de las apariencias), which launched her career in films. The cinema website Cineando referred to her as, "The Wonderful future of Spanish cinema".

She currently lives in Madrid, Spain.

Filmography

Cinema 
 Episodio III - Crónicas de la Vieja República (Coming soon)
 Los Girasoles Ciegos (2007)
 El espacio de las apariencias (2006)
 El Ángel Caído (2005)
 Hermanas cada 1 de Noviembre (2005)
 Ricardo, Piezas Descatalogadas (2005)
 Amazonas, últimos días (2004)
 I'm Sorry For You (2002)
 La Superamigas contra el DR.Vinilo (2001)
 Alianza Mortal (2001)
 La Nevera (2000)

Theatre 
Acóplate. Directed by Carlos Rico. (2007).

References

External links 
 Official Site
 
 Flickr Photo Collection

1980 births
Living people
Spanish stage actresses
Spanish film actresses
Spanish television actresses
Spanish television presenters
Actresses from Madrid
People from Seville
Spanish women television presenters
21st-century Spanish actresses